Rebecca Zamolo (born September 28, 1982) is an American YouTuber and social media personality known for her Game Master Network YouTube series and franchise. She is also known for her presence on TikTok, with over 17.1 million followers.

Internet career 
Zamolo's personal YouTube channel is focused on challenge, DIY, dancing and gymnastics videos. She also has a YouTube channel with her husband Matt Yoakum called Matt Slays which similarly features challenge video content. In 2018, Zamolo began an escape room-inspired YouTube channel and detective series called Game Master Network (formerly The Real Game Master) which features her and Matt
 solving clues to defeat an antagonist known as the "YouTube Hacker". In October 2020, a spin-off endless runner video game based on the series called The Game Master Network was released as an app to iOS and Android, created by Zamolo and digital product studio BoundaryLA. That December, a subscription service was also released through the app which allows subscribers to gain access to exclusive content, including musical performances, behind-the-scenes clips, character backstories and Q&As, for $8 a month. Other media released in connection to the series include a YouTube musical entitled Giant Rewind Musical in Real Life and two books published by HarperCollins. In October 2021, Rebecca and Matt were signed by management firm Underscore Talent. In addition to her YouTube content, Zamolo also runs a TikTok channel.

Personal life 
Rebecca Zamolo is the oldest of 5 siblings. She was competitive gymnast and a track runner prior to being diagnosed with ulcerative colitis after experiencing symptoms of severe abdominal pain and bleeding. Her colon also showed signs of pre-cancer. In 2014, she had her colon and large intestine removed. She later released a 40-minute feature documentary on Vimeo about her experiences with the disease called Inside/Out: My Battle with IBD.<ref name=":3  Rebecca married Matt  in 17th May 2014. In February 2021, the couple announced that Zamolo had suffered a chemical pregnancy and later a miscarriage after beginning IVF treatment. She chose the treatment due to her colon surgery adding complications to any pregnancy she would have. On February 23, 2022, Zamolo gave birth to a daughter, naming her Zadie.

Awards and nominations

Books

Notes

References 

Living people
American YouTubers
1982 births